Thomas Joseph Young (September 17, 1932 – March 20, 2022) was an American basketball coach. He coached at American University, Rutgers University, Catholic University and Old Dominion University.

Early life and education
Born in Natrona Heights, Pennsylvania, Young attended the University of Maryland, where he played on the basketball team, graduating in 1958. Young interrupted his college career for a 19-month tour of duty in Germany for the United States Army after the 1952–53 season. In 2003, the University of Maryland Athletic Hall of Fame inducted him into its ranks.

Coaching career
After graduating from Maryland in 1958, Young became head coach at the Catholic University of America. In nine seasons, Young went 134–88 at Catholic. From 1967 to 1969, Young was an assistant coach at his alma mater Maryland.

Young then was head coach at American University from 1969 to 1973 and Rutgers from 1973 to 1985. At Rutgers, Young's 1976 Scarlet Knights had an undefeated regular season record and advanced to the NCAA Final Four. Young also served as an assistant coach for the Washington Wizards of the National Basketball Association under Head Coach Eddie Jordan, who was the starting point guard on the 1976 Rutgers team. Under Young's tutelage, Phil Sellers, James Bailey, and Jordan evolved into All-Americans and went on to play in the NBA.

From 1985 to 1991, Young was head coach at Old Dominion. He led Old Dominion to the 1986 NCAA tournament in his first season, but this would be one of just two postseason tournaments in his six-year tenure. Old Dominion fired Young on March 7, 1991. Two months earlier, Old Dominion suspended Young two games for an incident caught on camera where Young and several Old Dominion players chased a Western Kentucky player towards the locker room after a 77–74 loss to Western Kentucky.

After leaving Old Dominion in 1991, Young became a television analyst for Atlantic 10 Conference broadcasts. On June 25, 2003, Washington Wizards head coach Eddie Jordan added Young to his coaching staff. After four seasons with the Wizards, Young retired from coaching on June 13, 2007.

Death
Young died at a hospital in Virginia Beach, Virginia on March 20, 2022.

Head coaching record
Sources:

See also
 List of NCAA Division I Men's Final Four appearances by coach

References

Further reading
 Feinstein, John. The Punch: One Night, Two Lives, and the Fight That Changed Basketball Forever. Back Bay Books, 2003.

1932 births
2022 deaths
American Eagles men's basketball coaches
American men's basketball coaches
American men's basketball players
Basketball coaches from Pennsylvania
Basketball players from Pennsylvania
Catholic University Cardinals men's basketball coaches
College men's basketball head coaches in the United States
Maryland Terrapins men's basketball players
Military personnel from Pennsylvania
Old Dominion Monarchs men's basketball coaches
People from Allegheny County, Pennsylvania
Rutgers Scarlet Knights men's basketball coaches
Sportspeople from the Pittsburgh metropolitan area
United States Army officers
Washington Wizards assistant coaches